Creophilus variegatus is a beetle of the Staphylinidae family, Staphylininae subfamily. This species occurs in South America (especially in Brazil and Peru).

References
 Universal Biological Indexer
 Biolib

Staphylininae
Beetles of South America